Rising Sun is an unincorporated community in White County, Illinois, United States. Rising Sun is located on the Wabash River southeast of Maunie.

References

Unincorporated communities in White County, Illinois
Unincorporated communities in Illinois